Mkhokheli "Kheli" Dube (born 18 June 1983 in Bulawayo) is a Zimbabwean footballer.

Career

Early career and college
Dube played in the youth system of his hometown team, Zimbabwe Saints, and played professionally for Two years in the Zimbabwe Premier Soccer League for Highlanders before coming to the United States.

He played college soccer for Lindsey Wilson College during his freshman and sophomore seasons, scoring 36 goals and tallying 13 assists in 50 games. After his sophomore season, he transferred to Coastal Carolina University for his junior and senior seasons, where he scored 16 goals and had 12 assists in 26 games. He missed the first five weeks of his senior season with an injury, but still scored 11 goals. He is a two-time All-Big South performer and was a member of the 2006 Big South All-Tournament Team. He was also the 2007 Big South Conference Player of the Year and a NSCAA All-South Atlantic performer.He was Big South Conference player of the week a record four times in his senior season.

During his college years Dube also played with both Michigan Bucks and Delaware Dynasty of the USL Premier Development League, helping the Bucks reach the PDL championship game both in 2006 (when they also won the title) and 2007.

Professional
Dube was drafted 8th in the 2008 MLS Supplemental Draft by New England Revolution. He made his debut for the Revs on 29 March 2008 as an 81st-minute substitute for Kenny Mansally in their opening day victory over Houston Dynamo. While Dube was not initially expected to play a major role with the Revolution, a long-term injury to Taylor Twellman gave him an opportunity to start a number of games. He scored his first MLS goal in his first start on 17 May 2008, and added several more goals in the following months, including the winning goal in the Revs' SuperLiga match against Santos Laguna. Dube was runner-up to Los Angeles Galaxy defender Sean Franklin for 2008 MLS Rookie of the Year. Scored his first career hat trick on 08/23/09 against Real Salt Lake and was voted for his first player of the week award the same week.

At the end of the 2011 season, New England declined his 2012 contract option and Dube entered the 2011 MLS Re-Entry Draft. He was selected by Chicago Fire in stage two of the draft on 12 December 2011. Dube signed with Chicago on 25 January 2012. After spending a six-month term without making an appearance, on 7 August 2012, he joined South African Premier Soccer League side AmaZulu on a three-year deal. In 2013 he joined Chicken Fc in Zimbabwe and won the Net One Charity Cup and after 2 and half years later, he moved to join Bulawayo City in 2016 where he captained the ambitious side under Philani 'Beffy" Ncube. Halfway through the 2017 season he made a move to FC Platinum where he won the Championship in 3 successive seasons 2017,2018 and 2019, also winning the Castle Challenge Cup twice in 2018 and 19. Recently returned to his boyhood club at Highlanders Fc for the 2020 season .

International
Dube has represented his country with the under 20 and under 23 national teams, but has yet to make his debut for the full Zimbabwe national football team.

Personal
Dube received his U.S. green card in 2010.

Honors

Highlanders FC
PSL league 2000,01,02

Lindsey Wilson
NAIA National Championship 2005

Michigan Bucks
 USL Premier Development League: 2006

New England Revolution
 North American SuperLiga: 2008

Chicken INN Fc
NetOne Charity Shield 2013

FC Platinum
Zimbabwean PSL Championship 2017,2018 and 2019
Castle Challenge Cup 2017
Castle Challenge Cup 2018

References

External links
 

1983 births
Living people
Zimbabwean footballers
Zimbabwean expatriate footballers
Coastal Carolina Chanticleers men's soccer players
Flint City Bucks players
Delaware Dynasty players
New England Revolution players
Chicago Fire FC players
AmaZulu F.C. players
Major League Soccer players
USL League Two players
Expatriate soccer players in the United States
Expatriate soccer players in South Africa
New England Revolution draft picks
Zimbabwean expatriate sportspeople in South Africa
Zimbabwean expatriate sportspeople in the United States
Lindsey Wilson Blue Raiders men's soccer players
Sportspeople from Bulawayo
Highlanders F.C. players
Association football forwards